Sexserrata is a monotypic moth genus of the family Noctuidae. Its only species, Sexserrata hampsoni, is found in the US state of California. Both the genus and species were first described by William Barnes and Foster Hendrickson Benjamin in 1922.

References

Acontiinae
Monotypic moth genera